Como, Australia may refer to:
Como, New South Wales, suburb of Sydney
Como, Western Australia, suburb of Perth